Hartwig Steenken (23 July 1941 – 10 January 1978) was a West German show jumper. He was born in Twistringen, and raised on his father's farm in Bowrede near Hoya in Lower Saxony.

Steenken won the individual title at the 1971 European Championships and the 1974 World Championships, and was on the West German team that won the gold medal at the 1972 Olympics, where he came fourth in the individual event. He won silver at the 1975 European Championships, and decided not to compete in the 1976 Olympics as he had no horse good enough to win; his earlier mount, Simona, being too old.

On 1 July 1977, Steenken broke the FEI's rules on amateurism by signing a sponsorship deal with Campari. Twelve days later, he sustained serious head injuries as a passenger in a car which crashed into a wall returning from an amateur football match in which he had played.  He fell into a coma and died six months later in Hanover.

References

External links

1941 births
1978 deaths
People from Diepholz (district)
Sportspeople from Lower Saxony
Olympic equestrians of West Germany
German male equestrians
Olympic gold medalists for West Germany
Equestrians at the 1968 Summer Olympics
Equestrians at the 1972 Summer Olympics
Road incident deaths in Germany
German show jumping riders
Olympic medalists in equestrian
Medalists at the 1972 Summer Olympics